Curtis Jon Giles (born November 30, 1958) is a Canadian former professional ice hockey defenceman. 

Selected by the Minnesota North Stars in the 1978 NHL Entry Draft, Giles had two tenures with the North Stars (1979–86 and 1987–91). During each, his steady defensive play helped guide the North Stars to appearances in the 1981 and 1991 Stanley Cup Finals. Giles also played for the New York Rangers and St. Louis Blues.

He had a portion of his left ring finger amputated on March 24, 1986 in order to compete in the 1986 Stanley Cup playoffs. The finger had a tumor in the bone and forced him to miss the end of the 1985-86 regular-season.

He currently serves as the head hockey coach at Edina High School, Minnesota. His team won the state title in 2010, 2013, 2014, and 2019.

Awards and honours

World Championship bronze medalist (1982)
Olympic silver medalist (1992)
"Honoured Member" of the Manitoba Hockey Hall of Fame

Career statistics

Regular season and playoffs

International

References

External links

Profile at hockeydraftcentral.com

1958 births
AHCA Division I men's ice hockey All-Americans
Canadian ice hockey defencemen
Ice hockey people from Manitoba
Ice hockey players at the 1992 Winter Olympics
Living people
Minnesota Duluth Bulldogs men's ice hockey players
Minnesota North Stars draft picks
Minnesota North Stars players
New York Rangers players
Oklahoma City Stars players
Olympic ice hockey players of Canada
Olympic silver medalists for Canada
People from The Pas
St. Louis Blues players
Olympic medalists in ice hockey
Medalists at the 1992 Winter Olympics